Elias Tahan (born September 11, 1986) is an American photographer currently located in Los Angeles.

Elias Tahan has been featured in publications such as Flaunt, Interview, and Nylon. His celebrity subjects include Jennifer Lopez, Malin Åkerman, Shirley Manson, Solange Knowles, Kristen Bell, Jena Malone, Nicole Richie, Ashley Tisdale, Rachael Leigh Cook, Sara Paxton, Shenae Grimes, Melanie Brown, and Shay Mitchell.

References

External links 
 
 Elias Tahan's blog
 

American photographers
1986 births
Living people
Artists from Los Angeles